Holly is an unincorporated community in Kitsap County, Washington, United States.  Named in 1895 for the presence of a large holly tree, Holly is located in the southwestern corner of the county, along the Hood Canal.

Holly is a residential area, although a substantial number (around half) of residents are summer-only.  Holly is known for its isolation, as well as its unusually high rain totals.  There are no commercial establishments in the community, as it is accessible only through back roads and is not near any major population centre.

References

Unincorporated communities in Washington (state)
Unincorporated communities in Kitsap County, Washington